Outlaws is a live album featuring duets by flautist Jeremy Steig and bassist Eddie Gómez recorded in Germany in 1976 and  released on the German Enja label the following year.

Reception

The AllMusic review by Ken Dryden stated that it "works extremely well because of the virtuoso talent of both musicians, along with their obviously compatibility" and ""Although this may very well have been a one-time event, it is much more than a novelty. Considering how little Steig has been recorded as a leader since the late '70s, this session should be of special interest to his fans".

Track listing
 "Outlaws" (Jeremy Steig, Eddie Gomez) − 7:11
 "Autumn Comes / Autumn Leaves" (Steig, Gomez / Joseph Kosma) − 9:09
 "Arioso" (Gomez) − 4:48
 "Nightmare" (Steig) − 7:07
 "Nardis" (Miles Davis) − 11:14

Personnel
Jeremy Steig – alto flute
Eddie Gómez − bass

References

Enja Records live albums
Eddie Gómez live albums
Jeremy Steig albums
1977 live albums
Collaborative albums